Tarfa bint Abdullah Al Sheikh (1884–1906) was one of the spouses of Abdulaziz bin Abdul Rahman, Emir of Nejd (later King Abdulaziz of Saudi Arabia), and the mother of Princess Noura and King Faisal.

Background and early life

Tarfa bint Abdullah Al Sheikh was born in 1884. Her mother was Haya bint Abdul Rahman Al Muqbel. Her family were from a village near Riyadh.

Tarfa's father, Abdullah bin Abdullatif Al Sheikh, was a member of the Al Sheikh family and one of the principal religious teachers and advisers to the Emir of Nejd, Abdulaziz bin Abdul Rahman. However, until Emir Abdulaziz captured Riyadh, Abdullah was a supporter of Emir Muhammad bin Abdullah Al Rashid. Tarfa was one of Muhammad ibn Abd al-Wahhab's eighth generation direct descendants.

Personal life and death
Tarfa bint Abdullah married Emir Abdulaziz in 1902 immediately after he captured Riyadh. She was his third wife. Tarfa's sister Munira married Abdulaziz's half-brother Muhammad bin Abdul Rahman, and her other sister, Sara, married Abdulaziz's full-brother Saad bin Abdul Rahman. These marriages were strategic moves to strengthen the links between the Al Sauds and the Al Sheikhs.

Abdulaziz and Tarfa's first child, Noura, was born in 1904. Their son, Faisal, was born in Riyadh in April 1906. Tarfa died in October 1906 when Faisal was just six months old. Her daughter Noura married a cousin, Khalid bin Muhammad, son of Muhammad bin Abdul Rahman. Tarfa's son Faisal would become king of Saudi Arabia in 1964.

Ancestry

References

Tarfa
Tarfa
1884 births
1906 deaths
Tarfa